Rexburg is a city in Madison County, Idaho, United States.  The population was 39,409 at the 2020 census.  The city is the county seat of Madison County and its largest city.  Rexburg is the principal city of the Rexburg, ID Micropolitan Statistical Area, which includes Fremont and Madison Counties. The city is home to Brigham Young University-Idaho (BYU-Idaho), a private institution operated by the Church of Jesus Christ of Latter-day Saints (LDS Church).

History

The city takes its name from founder Thomas Edwin Ricks. The city was incorporated in 1883.

The Navy Electronics Laboratory oceanographic research ship USS Rexburg was named for the city.

In June 1976, Rexburg was severely damaged by the Teton Dam Flood. The Teton River flowed through northern Rexburg, and left most of the city underwater for several days after the Teton Dam ruptured. A museum dedicated to the Teton Dam Flood and the history of Rexburg and the area, located in the basement of the Rexburg Tabernacle, has been a major city landmark for decades.

The city gained attention after the disappearance and deaths of Tylee Ryan and J.J. Vallow, two siblings who went missing in September 2019 and were found dead in June 2020.

Geography

Much of the city, including BYU-Idaho and the Rexburg Idaho Temple, rests on top of a shield volcano just north of Rigby. Eruptions are not expected in the near future so far south; Yellowstone National Park and Island Park are thought to be the most likely settings for future volcanic activity in the area. Many different types of volcanoes exist near Rexburg, including cinder cones, spatter cones, other shield volcanoes, and volcanic fissures. There are lava fields to the west and south of Rexburg, the results of open fissure eruptions from about two thousand years ago. The nearby Craters of the Moon National Monument presents the most obvious features of this recent activity. Sediment deposits enriched by volcanism make the surrounding area famous for its production of large starch-rich potatoes.

Rexburg is close to the St. Anthony Sand Dunes, the West Entrance of Yellowstone National Park and the Teton Range.

Climate
Rexburg experiences a humid continental climate (Köppen climate classification Dfb) with freezing winters and very warm summers – though even in the summer, nights are chilly and frosts have occurred in all months of the year. The climate classification may be inaccurate, as typical rainfall would place the climate as semi-arid.

Demographics

In 2010, city officials contested the census figures on the grounds that many college students were out of town while census workers were counting Rexburg's population.

It is estimated that 95 percent of Rexburg's population are members of the LDS Church.

2010 census
At the 2010 census there were 25,484 people, 7,179 households, and 4,925 families living in the city. The racial makeup of the city was 93.8% White, 0.6% African American, 0.2% Native American, 1.2% Asian, 0.2% Pacific Islander, 2.3% from other races, and 1.7% from two or more races. Hispanic or Latino of any race were 5.6%.

Of the 7,179 households 33.8% had children under the age of 18 living with them, 62.6% were married couples living together, 4.4% had a female householder with no husband present, 1.6% had a male householder with no wife present, and 31.4% were non-families. 9.2% of households were one person and 3.5% were one person aged 65 or older. The average household size was 3.41 and the average family size was 3.17.

The median age was 22.3 years. 20.4% of residents were under the age of 18; 49.2% were between the ages of 18 and 24; 19.9% were from 25 to 44; 7% were from 45 to 64; and 3.7% were 65 or older. The gender makeup of the city was 47.3% male and 52.7% female.

2000 census
At the 2000 census there were 17,257 people, 4,274 households, and 2,393 families living in the city. The racial makeup of the city was 95.20% White, 0.30% African American, 0.31% Native American, 0.66% Asian, 0.28% Pacific Islander, 2.23% from other races, and 1.03% from two or more races. Hispanic or Latino of any race were 4.04%.

Of the 4,274 households 30.5% had children under the age of 18 living with them, 47.7% were married couples living together, 5.9% had a female householder with no husband present, and 44.0% were non-families. 12.7% of households were one person and 5.5% were one person aged 65 or older.  The average household size was 3.71 and the average family size was 3.45.

The age distribution was 18.3% under the age of 18, 57.3% from 18 to 24, 11.9% from 25 to 44, 7.5% from 45 to 64, and 4.9% 65 or older.  The median age was 20 years. For every 100 females, there were 82.4 males.  For every 100 females age 18 and over, there were 77.0 males.

The median household income was $26,965 and the median family income was $36,047. Males had a median income of $27,280 versus $17,592 for females. The per capita income for the city was $9,173.  About 13.2% of families and 44.4% of the population were below the poverty line, including 11.7% of those under age 18 and 12.3% of those age 65 or over.

Government

Politics
Rexburg has been referred to as the "reddest place in America," owing to the area's strong conservative majority and political trends. Some political experts have considered Rexburg, Idaho, the true antithesis of San Francisco, America's liberal bastion. Since 1980, no Republican presidential candidate has won less than 57 percent of the county vote. In that same period, Republican presidential candidates polled more than 90 percent of the county's vote on three occasions: Ronald Reagan in 1984, George W. Bush in 2004 and Mitt Romney in 2012. John McCain came close to this level in 2008, drawing 85 percent of the vote.

Education

Public schools

Madison School District 321 is the local school district.

The city supports 6 elementary schools; Adams, Burton, Hibbard, Kennedy, Lincoln, and South Fork. Madison Middle School follows the elementary school, serving grades 5–6. Madison Junior High School serves grades 7–9. The two high schools within the city limits are Central High and Madison High School.

Higher education
Rexburg is home to BYU-Idaho, a private institution operated by the LDS Church. The university began as a small high school-level academy in 1888 and was eventually established as Ricks College, in honor of Mormon pioneer and city founder, Thomas E. Ricks. On August 10, 2001, it officially became a four-year university and assumed the name BYU-Idaho.

Madison Memorial Hospital
The City of Rexburg and the surrounding areas are serviced by Madison Memorial Hospital located just east of the city's downtown area. The hospital offers regular classes in an attempt to educate the community on such things as preparing for childbirth and first aid for children, as well as holding Conferences and Health Fairs. In 2012, Rachel Gonzales - Madison's CEO, was ranked among the "50 Rural Hospital CEO's to Know" by Becker's Hospital Review. In 2013, Madison was ranked the healthiest county in Idaho. In 2014, the Leapfrog Group shared the results of a study which indicates that Madison Memorial Hospital received an A in comparison to other hospitals in the United States.

Media
Rexburg is part of the Idaho Falls–Pocatello media market, which includes southeastern Idaho and parts of northwestern Wyoming. Media outlets licensed to or located in Rexburg include:

Television
 K51KL, channel 51
Radio
 KBYR 91.5 FM BYU-Idaho Radio (Religious, Radio)
 KBYI 94.3 FM BYU-Idaho Radio (Public Radio)
 KRXK 1230 AM (Sports)
Newspapers
 Rexburg Standard Journal
 BYU-Idaho Scroll
 Explore Rexburg
 Ennui Magazine

In popular culture 
 Rexburg is mentioned in the 9th verse of the song "I've Been Everywhere" by Hank Snow, a song that was also sung by Johnny Cash.
 The nearby St. Anthony sand dunes are referenced in the movie Napoleon Dynamite, as the location where Kip and Napoleon's grandma breaks her coccyx.
 In Shannon Hale's The Unbeatable Squirrel Girl, HYDRA is mentioned to have a secret base there in the epilogue.
 Afroman mentions Rexburg in his song "Idaho" on his 2008 album "Waiting to Inhale".

Notable people

 Brandon Bair, defensive end for NFL's Oakland Raiders
 Jim Dennis, Hall of Fame harness racing driver.
 Vernon M. Guymon, Brigadier general in the Marine Corps and Naval Aviator
 D. Mark Hegsted, Harvard University nutritionist
 Christian Jacobs, co-creator of children's TV show Yo Gabba Gabba! and lead singer for The Aquabats
 Paul Kruger, linebacker for NFL's Cleveland Browns
 Matt Lindstrom, Major League Baseball pitcher for Chicago White Sox
 Clayton Mortensen, Major League Baseball pitcher for Boston Red Sox
 Mark Ricks, Idaho state legislator
 James LeVoy Sorenson, businessman and inventor.
 Wayne D. Wright, jockey, winner of 1942 Kentucky Derby, 1945 Preakness and 1934 Belmont Stakes

References

External links

City of Rexburg, Idaho Website Portal style website, Government, Business, Library, Recreation and more

Cities in Idaho
Cities in Madison County, Idaho
County seats in Idaho
Rexburg, Idaho micropolitan area
Populated places established in 1883
1883 establishments in Idaho Territory